The 1932 Columbia Lions football team was an American football team that represented Columbia University as an independent during the 1932 college football season.  In its third season under head coach Lou Little, the team compiled a 7–1–1 record and outscored opponents . The team played its home games at Baker Field in Upper Manhattan.

Schedule

References

Columbia
Columbia Lions football seasons
Columbia Lions football